Don Rickles Speaks! is a comedy album released in 1969 by Don Rickles. It begins with an introduction by G. Bernard Owens who tells the audience that the recording they are about to hear reveals the serious side of Rickles and his "thoughts of people, life, philosophy." Immediately after the introduction, we hear laughter, which completely contradicts what was heard previously. In the album, Rickles is interviewed by a panel of "eminent experts" who ask him about celebrities such as Dean Martin, Johnny Carson, Kirk Douglas, Robert Goulet, and Frank Sinatra, as well as such music acts as The Electric Prunes and Snooky Lanson.

Track listing

References

1969 albums
Don Rickles albums
1960s comedy albums
1960s spoken word albums